Müptezhel is the debut studio album of Turkish rapper Ezhel. It was released on May 25, 2017. The album contains 12 songs. It was produced by Bugy, DJ Artz and Ezhel.

Track listing

References

2017 debut albums
Ezhel albums
Turkish-language albums